Sandrine Champion (born 29 August 1980 at Saint-Quentin) is a French athlete, who specializes in the high jump.

Biography  
She won two French championship titles in the high jump: one in Outdoors in 2015 and one Indoors in 2008.

In 2009, she won the gold medal in the High Jump at the Francophone Games at Beirut with a leap of 1.84 m.

Her personal best, established in 2009 in Angers, is 1.86 m.

Prize list  
 French Championships in Athletics:
 winner of the high jump in 2015; 2nd in 2009 and 2013; 3rd in 2010 and 2011.
 French Indoors Athletics Championships:
 winner of the high jump in 2008

Records

Notes and references

External links  
 profile Sandrine Champion  on all-athletics.com

1980 births
Living people
French female high jumpers
People from Saint-Quentin, Aisne
Sportspeople from Aisne